Mount Rinjani is an active volcano in Indonesia on the island of Lombok. Administratively the mountain is in the Regency of North Lombok, West Nusa Tenggara (Indonesian: Nusa Tenggara Barat, NTB). It is also the highest point in the Indonesian province of West Nusa Tenggara.

Adjacent to the volcano is a  caldera, which is filled partially by the crater lake known as Segara Anak or Anak Laut (Child of the Sea), due to the color of its water, as blue as the sea (laut). Sasak tribe and Hindu people assume the lake and the mount are sacred and some religious activities are occasionally done in the two areas. UNESCO made Mount Rinjani Caldera a part of the Global Geoparks Network in April 2018.

Geography

Lombok is one of the Lesser Sunda Islands, a small archipelago which, from west to east, consists of Bali, Lombok, Sumbawa, Flores, Sumba and the Timor islands; all are located at the edge of the Australian continental shelf. Volcanoes in the area are formed due to the action of oceanic crusts and the movement of the shelf itself. Rinjani is one of at least 129 active volcanoes in Indonesia, four of which belong to the volcanoes of the Sunda Arc trench system forming part of the Pacific Ring of Fire – a section of fault lines stretching from the Western Hemisphere through Japan and South East Asia.

The islands of Lombok and Sumbawa lie in the central portion of the Sunda Arc. The Sunda Arc is home to some of the world's most dangerous and explosive volcanoes. The eruption of nearby Mount Tambora on Sumbawa is known for the most violent eruption in recorded history on 15 April 1815, with a scale 7 on the VEI.

The highlands are forest clad and mostly undeveloped. The lowlands are highly cultivated. Rice, soybeans, coffee, tobacco, cotton, cinnamon, cacao, cloves, cassava, corn, coconuts, copra, bananas and vanilla are the major crops grown in the fertile soils of the island. The slopes are populated by the indigenous Sasak population.  There are also some basic tourist related activities established on Rinjani primarily in or about the village of Senaru.

Rinjani has a steep-sided conical profile when viewed from the east, but the western side of the compound volcano is truncated by the 6 x 8.5 km, oval-shaped Segara Anak caldera. The western half of the caldera contains a 230-metre-deep lake whose crescentic form results from growth of the post-caldera cone Barujari at the eastern end of the caldera.

Geologic summary
On the basis of the plate tectonics theory, Rinjani is one of the series of volcanoes built in the Lesser Sunda Islands due to the subduction of Indo-Australian oceanic crust beneath the Lesser Sunda Islands, and it is interpreted that the source of melted magma is about  depth.

The geology and tectonic setting of Lombok (and nearby Sumbawa) are described as being in the central portion of the Sunda Arc. The oldest exposed rocks are Miocene, suggesting that subduction and volcanism began considerably later than in Java and Sumatra to the west, where there are abundant volcanic and intrusive rocks of Late Mesozoic age. The islands are located on the eastern edge of the Sunda shelf, in a zone where crustal thickness is apparently rapidly diminishing, from west to east.

The seismic velocity structure of the crust in this region is transitional between typical oceanic and continental profiles and the Mohorovičić discontinuity (Moho) appears to lie at about  depth. These factors tend to suggest that there has been limited opportunity for crustal contamination of magmas erupted on the islands of Lombok and Sumbawa. In addition, these islands lie to the west of those parts of the easternmost Sunda and west Banda arcs where collision with the Australian plate is apparently progressing.

There is a marked offset in the line of active volcanoes between the most easterly Sumbawa volcano (Sangeang Api) and the line of active volcanoes in Flores. This suggests that a major transcurrent fault cut across the arc between Sumbawa Island and Flores. This is considered to be a feature representing a major tectonic discontinuity between the east and west Sunda Arcs (the Sumba Fracture). Further, a marked absence of shallow and intermediate earthquake activity in the region to the south of Lombok and Sumbawa is a feature interpreted to represent a marked break in the Sunda Arc Zone. Faulting and folding caused strong deformation in the eastern part of Lombok Basin and is characterized by block faulting, shale diapirs and mud volcano.

Volcanology 

The Rinjani caldera-forming eruption is thought to have occurred in the 13th century. Dated to "late spring or summer of 1257," this 1257 Samalas eruption is now considered the likely source of high concentrations of sulfur found in widely dispersed ice core samples and may have been "the most powerful volcanic blast since humans learned to write." The massive eruption may have triggered an episode of global cooling and failed harvests. Before this eruption, the Segara Anak caldera was a volcanic mountain named Samalas, which was higher than Rinjani.

Eruption rate, eruption sites, eruption type and magma composition have changed during the last 10,000 years before the caldera forming eruption. This cone has since been renamed Gunung Barujari (or 'Gunung Baru Jari' in Indonesian).

The first historical eruption occurred in September 1847. The most recent eruption of Mount Rinjani was in May 2010 and the most recent significant eruptions occurred during a spate of activity from 1994 to 1995 which resulted in the further development of Gunung Barujari. Historical eruptions at Rinjani dating back to 1847 have been restricted to Barujari cone and the Rombongan dome (in 1944) and consist of moderate explosive activity and occasional lava flows that have entered Segara Anak lake. The eruptive history of Rinjani prior to 1847 is not available as the island of Lombok is in a location that remained very remote to the record keeping of the era.

On 3 November 1994, a cold lahar (volcanic mudflow) from the summit area of Rinjani volcano traveled down the Kokok Jenggak River killing thirty people from the village of Aikmel who were caught by surprise when collecting water from the river in the path of the flow.

In connection with the eruption of the cone Gunung Barujari the status for Gunung Rinjani was raised from Normal (VEI Level 1) to 'be vigilant' (VEI Level 2) since 2 May 2009.

Volcanic composition

Based on the composition of andesites which have very low Ni concentrations and low Mg/Mg+Fe It is suggested that the Rinjani suite is of mantle origin, but that all the andesites and dacites as well as many of the basalts have probably been modified by fractional crystallization processes. It is concluded that the Rinjani calc-alkaline suite, which in many respects is typical of many suites erupted by circum-pacific volcanoes, probably originated by partial melting of the peridotite mantle-wedge overlying the active Benioff Zone beneath Lombok Island. The Pleistocene-Recent calcalkaline suite from the active volcano, Rinjani is composed of a diverse range of lavas. These include: ankaramite, high-Al basalt, andesite, high-K andesite and dacite. Sr-isotopic and geochemical constraints suggest that this suite was derived from the sub-arc mantle. Geochemical models suggest that fractional crystallization is an important process in the suite's differentiation, although the series: ankaramite-high-Al basalt-andesite-dacite does not represent a continuously evolving spectrum of liquids.

In September 1995 an aviation report was issued concerning an unconfirmed ash cloud from Rinjani. A NOTAM about volcanic activity from Rinjani was issued by the Bali Flight Information Region on the morning of 12 September. An ash cloud was reportedly drifting to the south west with the cloud top around  altitude.

On 3 November 1994, a cold lahar (volcanic mudflow) from the summit area of Rinjani volcano traveled down the Kokok Jenggak River killing thirty people from the village of Aikmel who were caught by surprise when collecting water from the river in the path of the flow. One person remained missing as of 9 November 1994. No damage to the village was reported. Local volcanologists noted that additional 
lahars could be triggered by heavy rainfall.

During 4 June 1994 – January 1995 the DVGHM (Directorate of Volcanology and Geological Hazard Mitigation) noted that explosions occurred on Rinjani.  Those explosions came from the Barujari volcano.

Between 3 June 1994 and 21 November 1994 records of Rinjani's eruptive history indicate activity accorded Volcanic Explosivity Index (VEI) with a rating of 3(?) with the area of activity described as Gunung Barujari. Eruptive characteristics documented for the events of that time are described as, central vent eruption with an explosive eruption, with pyroclastic flow(s), lava flow(s), fatalities and mudflow(s) (lahars).

In May 1994 a glow was noticed on the crater floor of Barujari cone, which at this time had undergone no significant activity since August 1966. A portable seismograph (PS-2) and telemetry seismograph (Teledyne) were put into operation on 27 May and 9 June, respectively. One volcanic earthquake event/day was recorded on 27, 28, 30, and 31 May. After 4 June, however, volcanic tremor with a maximum amplitude of 35 mm was recorded, presumably associated with the upward movement of magma.
Between 3 and 10 June 1994, up to 172 explosions could be heard each day from the Sembalun Lawang volcano observatory (about  NE). During this period, seismic data indicated a dramatic increase in the number of explosions per day, from 68 to 18,720.

Between 28 March 1966 and 8 August 1966 records of Rinjani's eruptive history indicate activity accorded a Volcanic Explosivity Index (VEI) rating of 1.
Eruptive characteristics were documented as a central vent eruption, explosive eruption and lava flow(s).

In December 1944, Rinjani appears to have had a significant event. Between 25 December 1944 and 1(?) January 1945 eruptive activity is rated 2 on the Volcanic Explosivity Index (VEI) The event has been listed in the historical records of the Global Volcanism Program indicating a lava volume: of  occurring in an area of activity on the north west flank of Barujari (Rombongan). The eruptive characteristics are described a central vent eruption on the flank (excentric) vent, a crater lake eruption, explosive eruption, lava flow(s) and a lava dome extrusion with associated damage to land, property.

On 27 September 2004 a DVGHM (Directorate of Volcanology and Geological Hazard Mitigation) report noted the decision to increase Rinjani's hazard status to Volcanic Explosivity Index (VEI) Alert Level 2 (Yellow). During the last third of 2004, the number of volcanic and tectonic earthquakes had increased. Their increase followed a rise in the number of tectonic earthquakes that began 18 August 2004. Tremor registered on 23, 24, 25, and 26 September 2004. Tremor amplitudes ranged between 12 and 13.5 mm, and the duration of the tremor stood between 94 and 290 seconds.

At 05:30 on 1 October 2004 Rinjani erupted. The eruption caused authorities to immediately raise the hazard status to Alert Level 3 (Orange). Details regarding the initial 1 October 2004 eruption are indistinct. Gray, thick ash columns drifted to the north and detonation sounds accompanied every explosion. Successive explosions occurred at intervals of 5 to 160 minutes. Explosions vented on the north eastern slope of Barujari volcano. Some material also vented from Barujari's peak and fell down around its edifice. A press report in the Jakarta Post indicated that evacuations were not considered necessary. A Volcanic Explosivity Index (VEI):2 rating was issued for the activity between 1 May 2004 through to (on or after) 5 October 2004.

Activity since 2009

2009 
On 27 April 2009 Gunung Barujari became active, with activity continuing through to May 2009. A Volcanic Explosivity Index (VEI):2 rating was issued for the activity between 2 May 2009 and 20 December 2009. The activity during this period was described as having the characteristics of central vent eruption, flank (excentric) vent, explosive eruption and lava flow(s).

2010 
Rinjani erupted three times on 22 May 2010 with activity continuing until early on 23 May. According to the volcano's official monitoring agency, ash from Mount Rinjani was reported as rising up to two kilometers into the atmosphere and damaged crops. The volcano did not threaten villagers at that time.

From February 2010 through April 2010 seismicity decreased, although the maximum amplitude of earthquakes increased. CVGHM (Center of Volcanology and Geological Hazard Mitigation) also noted that ash eruptions and ejected incandescent material fell within Rinjani caldera, but some ash was blown out of the caldera.

The activity in early 2010 centred about Gunung Barujari, a post-caldera cone that lies within the Rinjani's caldera lake of Segara Anak. The Volcanological Survey of Indonesia reported on 1 May 2010, that a column of smoke was observed rising from G. Rinjani "issuing eruptions 1300–1600 metres tall with thick brown color and strong pressure".  Their report Evaluasi Kegiatan G. Rinjani of 4 May also stated that on 1 May 2010 at 10:00 four events of explosive earthquake were recorded with a maximum amplitude of 6–53 mm and 110 seconds long earthquake, earthquake tremor events with a maximum amplitude of 1 mm and 55 second long duration, 15 Local Tectonic earthquake events and two events of tectonic earthquake.

The Volcanic Explosivity Index (VEI) Alert Level was raised to 2 (on a scale of 1–4) on 2 May 2010. Level 1 is "Normal" and Level 2 is "Advisory" with an Aviation Alert color of Yellow-Advisory. Based on analysis of satellite imagery, the Darwin VAAC (Volcanic Ash Advisory Center) reported that on 5 May a possible ash plume from Rinjani rose to an altitude of  a.s.l. and drifted  NW. The plume was not seen in imagery about six hours later.

2015 
On 31 October 2015, Mount Rinjani started erupting again.

2018 
On 29 July 2018 a magnitude 6.4 earthquake caused landslides on the north portion of Mount Rinjani.

August 2018 
On 5 August 2018, a second earthquake struck Lombok, causing more landslides and small tsunamis due to its proximity to the northern coast. The area around Rinjani was evacuated due to concerns of a possible eruption, but no increase in activity was detected at Rinjani or the nearby volcano Mount Agung on Bali.

Monitoring program 
Observers at this post monitor G.Rinjani, G.Barujari/G.Tenga within the Segara Anak Caldera.

Rinjani National Park

The volcano and the caldera are protected by the Gunung Rinjani National Park established in 1997.  Tourism is increasingly popular with trekkers able to visit the rim, make their way into the caldera or even to make the more arduous climb to the highest point; fatalities, however, are not unheard of. In July 2009 the summit route was closed due to volcanic activity at that time and subsequently reopened when the activity decreased. During early 2010 up to and including May 2010 access to Rinjani was at times again restricted due to volcanic activity.

The park is popular for mountain climbs and trekking and represents an important nature reserve and water catchment area. The park is officially  within the park boundaries and includes a further  of protected forest outside. The mountain and its satellites form the Mount Rinjani National Park (Taman Nasional Gunung Rinjani). Mount Rinjani has obtained the World Legacy Award from Conservation International and Traveller (2004), and was a finalist for Tourism for Tomorrow Awards (2005 and 2008) from the World Travel Tourism Council (WTTC).

The Rinjani scops owl was found in 2003 and after 10 years of research was recognized as a new endemic species (specimens had been collected in the 19th century but had been identified as being Mollucas scops owls).

Eruption history of Rinjani

See also 
 List of volcanoes in Indonesia

References

External links 

 Smithsonian Institution's Global Volcanism Program – Rinjani – Eruption history, weekly activity reports, photos, synonyms and subsidiary features
 The Geology of Indonesia-The Lesser Sunda Islands (Wikibooks)
 Account of an ascent of Rinjani in GEO ExPro magazine
 Rinjani National Park
Rinjani Trekking by Lombok Journey
Rinjani Trekking with local guide around senaru and sembalun by RinjaniISME

Geoparks in Indonesia
 
Stratovolcanoes of Indonesia
Volcanoes of the Lesser Sunda Islands
Mountains of Indonesia
Volcanic crater lakes
Landforms of Lombok
Active volcanoes of Indonesia
21st-century volcanic events
2010 natural disasters
2010 in Indonesia
Volcanic eruptions in Indonesia
VEI-7 volcanoes
Calderas of Indonesia
Holocene stratovolcanoes